Oseim is a small town in the Eastern Region of southeastern Ghana. It was the birthplace of Albert Adu Boahen.

Populated places in the Eastern Region (Ghana)